John Parker may refer to:

Politicians

Canada
John Mason Parker (Saskatchewan politician) (1882–1960), politician in Saskatchewan, Canada
John Havelock Parker (1929–2020), commissioner of the Canadian Northwest Territories
John Parker (Canadian politician) (born 1954), former Ontario MPP and Toronto City Councillor

United Kingdom
John Parker (died 1617) (1548–1617), MP for Truro, Hastings, Launceston and East Looe
John Parker (died 1619) (1548–1619), MP for Queenborough
John Parker (MP for Rochester) (fl. 1631–1680), recorder in Kent, MP for Rochester, a judge and a Baron of the Exchequer
John Parker (MP for Clitheroe) (1754–1797), MP for Clitheroe
John Parker (Whig politician) (1799–1881), British politician of the Victorian era, Privy Counsellor, 1853
John Parker (Labour politician) (1906–1987), British politician, Labour MP for Dagenham, 1945–1983
John Parker, 1st Baron Boringdon (1735–1788),  British peer and Member of Parliament
John Parker, 1st Earl of Morley (1772–1840), British peer and politician
John Parker, 6th Earl of Morley (1923–2015), British peer

United States
John Parker (activist), American presidential candidate (2004) of the Workers World Party
John Parker (Continental Congress) (1759–1832), South Carolina delegate to the Continental Congress, 1786–1788
John Parker (Iowa politician), member of the Michigan Territory's last legislature
John Parker (Montana politician) (born 1970), state representative of Montana
John Parker (Oswego County, NY) (1810–?), New York assemblyman 1866 and 1870
John M. Parker (1863–1939), Democratic governor of Louisiana, 1920–1924
John M. Parker (New York politician) (1805–1873), congressman from New York
John Francis Parker (1907–1992), mayor of the city of Taunton, Massachusetts

Sportsmen
John Parker (cricketer, born c. 1823) (c. 1823 – 1892), Scottish cricketer
John Parker (West Indian cricketer) (1871–1946)
John Parker (water polo) (born 1946), American water polo player
John Parker (New Zealand cricketer) (born 1951), New Zealand test cricketer
John Willie Parker, English former professional footballer
John Parker (Australian footballer) (born 1971), former Australian rules footballer 
John Parker (English cricketer) (1902–1984), English cricketer, played for Hampshire 1926–29 & 1932–33
John Parker (Australian cricketer) (born 1936), Australian cricketer
John Parker (rower) (born 1967), American rower
John Parker (American football), American football player and coach

Jurists
John Parker (Irish judge) (c. 1500–1564), English-born merchant, politician and judge
John Parker (English judge) (fl. 1655), member of the judiciary during the Interregnum, sat on the High Court of Justice in 1649 that tried Capel, Holland and Hamilton; father of Samuel Parker, Bishop of Oxford
John Victor Parker (1928–2014), United States federal judge
John J. Parker (1885–1958), American judge who served at the Nuremberg Trials and missed a nomination to the Supreme Court by one vote

Arts
John Parker (author) (born 1938), British author and journalist
John Parker (musician), British musician from the band Nizlopi
John Parker (painter), English painter
John Parker (potter) (born 1947), New Zealand potter
John Adams Parker (1829–1905), New York painter
John Henry Parker (writer) (1806–1884), English writer on architecture
Jon Kimura Parker (born 1959), Canadian pianist
John L. Parker Jr. (born 1947), American novelist
J. S. Parker (1944–2017), New Zealand painter
John William Parker (1792–1870), English publisher and printer

Military
John Parker (Jacobite) (c. 1651–in or after 1719), English army officer and Jacobite conspirator
John Parker (captain) (1729–1775), captain of the Lexington militia at the Battle of Lexington
John Boteler Parker (1786–1851), English army general
John Frederick Parker (United States Navy) (1853–1911), United States Navy captain and one-time governor of American Samoa, 1908–1910
John Lankester Parker (1896–1965), British test pilot
John Henry Parker (general) (1866–1942), (aka "Gatling Gun Parker"), U.S. Army general, officer commanding the Gatling Gun Detachment in Cuba during the Spanish–American War

Other
John Parker (bishop) (died 1681), Church of Ireland clergyman 
John Parker (cleric) (1798–1860), cleric, artist and author of The Passengers: containing the Celtic Annals
John Parker (priest), English Anglican priest 
John Parker (pioneer) (1758–1836), founder of Fort Parker in Texas, killed in the Fort Parker massacre
John Palmer Parker (rancher) (1790–1868), founder of the Parker Ranch of Hawaii
John Parker (abolitionist) (1827–1900), African American abolitionist, inventor, and industrialist
John Frederick Parker (1830–1890), bodyguard to Abraham Lincoln, derelict of duty the night of Assassination of Abraham Lincoln
John Richard Parker (1834–1915), American kidnapped by Native American raiding party
Michael Parker (courtier) (John Michael Avison Parker, 1920–2001), Duke of Edinburgh's private secretary
Sir John Parker (businessman) (born 1942), British businessman
John Parker, fictional character in Buckaroo Banzai
John C. Parker (died 1927), trade unionist
John Parker (botanist), British botanist, Cambridge University
John Parker (whaling master) (1800–1867), whaler
John William Robinson Parker, British soldier and antiquarian

See also
Johnny Parker (disambiguation)
Jack Parker (disambiguation)
Jackie Parker (1932–2006), American football player